Revelations was a late-night soap opera created by Russell T Davies, Brian B. Thompson, and Tony Wood, produced by Granada and starring Judy Loe and Paul Shelley. It aired in the Granada, Central and Carlton ITV regions between 1994 and 1996. The series is family drama about the family of the priest Edward Rattigan (Shelley) and his wife Jessica (Loe). It follows and critiques the organisational structure of the Anglican Church at the turn of the millennium.

In one episode, a female vicar, Joan (Sue Holderness), comes out as a lesbian in a two-hander with Mary Beckett (Carole Nimmons). It was the first openly gay character written by Davies, who would later go on to create and produce the gay-centric series Queer as Folk, Bob & Rose, Torchwood and Cucumber. Davies attributes the storyline to the "pressure-cooker nature" of the series leading to larger storylines, and the recent ordination of female vicars in the Church of England; Davies recalls that "when they introduced women to the church, I was thinking 'Yes! We can do a lesbian vicar!'". He also revealed that a wedding storyline resulted in the groom falling in love with his best man, another landmark moment in TV.

References

External links
 

1994 British television series debuts
1996 British television series endings
1990s British television soap operas
British television soap operas
Television shows written by Russell T Davies
ITV soap operas
Television series by ITV Studios
Carlton Television
Television shows produced by Granada Television
English-language television shows
Television series created by Russell T Davies